Odd Senses is the third and final album by Psyopus, released on February 17, 2009 via Metal Blade Records.

Musical themes
In an interview with MetalSucks, Arpmandude elaborated on some of the lyrical themes present on the album saying that many of the songs are not "about being pissed off at women."  "Medusa" describes the difficulty of getting over someone when he have to see them all the time. ".44" refers to Son of Sam while "Duct Tape Smile" describes the set of a snuff film. "The Burning Halo" touches on exorcism, "X and Y" describes a sex change and "Ms Shyflower" is about being buried alive.

Track listing

Personnel 
Psyopus
 Brian Woodruff – vocals
 Christopher 'Arpmandude' Arp – guitars
 Michael Horn – bass
 Jason Bauers – drums, percussion, marimba

Additional musicians
 Jennifer Manganiello – guest vocals 
 Adam McOwen – violin 
 Matt Colbert – classical guitar 
 Owen Tomaszewski – cello 

Production and design
 Doug White – engineering
 Craig Schriber – artwork, design
 Justina Villnueva – photography

Trivia 
 "Imogen's Puzzle Part 3" was composed in reverse to be played along with "Imogen's Puzzle Part 1".
 The song "Duct Tape Smile" became available on Tap Tap Revenge 3 since March 23, 2009. It is available free from the Metal Blade TTR Channel. It is notable as being one of the hardest songs to be featured in the game, due to its use of irregularly placed speed-taps.

References

2009 albums
Psyopus albums
Metal Blade Records albums
Albums recorded at Watchmen Recording Studios